The Federal Circuit Court of Australia, formerly known as the Federal Magistrates Court of Australia or the Federal Magistrates Service, was an Australian court with jurisdiction over matters broadly relating to family law and child support, administrative law, admiralty law, bankruptcy, copyright, human rights, industrial law, migration, privacy and trade practices.

The Court was created to deal with the increasing workload of the Federal Court of Australia and the Family Court of Australia, by hearing less complex cases for them and freeing those Courts to deal only with more complex cases. The Federal Circuit Court dealt with approximately 95% of migration and bankruptcy applications filed in the federal courts. Approximately 90% of the Court's workload was in the area of family law. The Court also deals with nearly 80% of all family law matters filed in the federal courts. It is also intended to replace (in part) the federal jurisdiction with which state courts have been invested under the Judiciary Act 1903.

In 2021, the Morrison Government introduced legislation merging the Federal Circuit with the Family Court of Australia to form the Federal Circuit and Family Court of Australia, effective from 1 September 2021.

History
The court was established on 23 December 1999 by the Australian Government as the Federal Magistrates Court of Australia, as a result of royal assent of the Federal Magistrates Act 1999 (Cth). The court is now known as the Federal Circuit Court of Australia and the Act as the Federal Circuit Court of Australia Act 1999.  Its first judicial officers were appointed in 2000; it first applications were filed on 23 June 2000 and the Court's first sittings were conducted on 3 July 2000 in Adelaide, Brisbane, Canberra, Melbourne, Parramatta and Townsville.

On 12 April 2013, in recognition of its increased jurisdiction and its role as an intermediate court servicing regional centres as well as capital cities throughout Australia, it was renamed the Federal Circuit Court of Australia and its judicial officers received the title "Judge" instead of "Federal Magistrate". 
 
There are now over 60 judges of the Court. The first Chief Federal Magistrate, Diana Bryant left the court in 2004 when she was appointed Chief Justice of the Family Court of Australia, the third person to be appointed that position since the establishment of the Family Court. The current Chief Judge is Will Alstergren, appointed to the role in 2017. The current judges of the Court come from a wide variety of backgrounds, including barristers, solicitors, academic lawyers, as well as legal aid and public service lawyers.

In 2006 the Court was embroiled in controversy when it was revealed that Magistrate Jennifer Rimmer had plagiarised the work of her colleagues when writing decisions.

Jurisdiction
Bankruptcy, migration and family law comprise the largest components of the Court's work.

Family law
There has been a progressive shift over the past 10 years in the balance of workload between the Federal Circuit Court and the Family Court of Australia, with the majority of all family law matters and most divorces now heard in the Federal Circuit Court. This has resulted in the Family Court of Australia becoming a smaller court which manages all appeals and deals with the most lengthy and complex family law cases.

The Federal Circuit Court's family law jurisdiction covers:
 Parenting – an order regarding the child/children of a marriage or de facto relationship that has broken down.
 Financial – an order relating to the division of property or payment of maintenance following the breakdown of a marriage or eligible de facto relationship.
 Divorce – all applications for divorce, except orders relating to nullity and validity of marriage and divorce.
 Child support – certain applications and appeals.
 Child maintenance – an order for child maintenance in special circumstances.
 Parentage declarations and testing – an order declaring that a person is a parent of a child/children or to assist in determining the parentage of a child/children.
 Contravention – an application alleging a breach of a court order.
 Injunctions – an application for an injunction in a current or pending matter.
 Location and recovery – an order for information or the ability to publish information about a child/children's location or the return of a child/children to a party.

General federal law
The Federal Circuit Court shares jurisdiction with the Federal Court of Australia. The largest volume of the court's general federal law work is in bankruptcy applications and migration. The Federal Circuit Court deals with 95 per cent of all migration applications that are filed in the federal courts. In addition, the Court deals with a significant number of industrial law and human rights matters.

The Federal Circuit Court's general federal law jurisdiction covers the following:

Administrative law
The Court has original jurisdiction under the Administrative Decisions (Judicial Review) Act 1977 (Cth). The Court, on remittal from the Federal Court, hears appeals from the Administrative Appeals Tribunal.

Admiralty
 In personam actions (claims against a specific person or company) such as freight claims and seafarer's wages. 
 In rem actions remitted by the Federal Circuit Court of Australia and state Supreme Courts.

Bankruptcy
All civil claims and matters under the Bankruptcy Act 1966, except those requiring jury trials. The vast majority of bankruptcy court cases in Australia are heard by The Federal Circuit Court (92% in 2004–5).

Consumer law (Trade practices)
The Court has civil jurisdiction with respect to claims under the following provisions of the Competition and Consumer Act 2010 (formerly known as the  Trade Practices Act 1974):
 Section 46 (Misuse of Market Power)
 Section IVB (Industry Codes)
 Part XI (Application of the Australian Consumer Law as a law of the Commonwealth), and
 Schedule 2 (Australian Consumer Law).

The Court can provide injunctive relief and award damages of up to $750 000. The Court also has civil jurisdiction with respect to claims under the National Consumer Credit Protection Act 2009. 
There is provision in certain proceedings for a litigant to elect that an application for compensation be dealt with as a small claims proceeding.

This jurisdiction includes hearing matters relating to (but not limited to) unfair trade practices, product safety and information matters, consumer protection matters, pyramid selling, and importation and manufacture of defective goods.

Human Rights
Federal unlawful discrimination  matters under the Australian Human Rights Commissions Act 1986 relating to complaints under the:
 Age Discrimination Act 2004
 Disability Discrimination Act 1992
 Racial Discrimination Act 1974, and
 Sex Discrimination Act 1984.

The Court has concurrent jurisdiction with the Federal Court of Australia to hear and determine complaints of unlawful discrimination based on sex, age, race and disability. Its power to grant relief is wide – it may, for example, grant unlimited damages.

Industrial law
The court has concurrent jurisdiction with the Federal Court for matters under the:
 Fair Work Act 2009
 Fair Work (Transitional Provisions and Consequential Amendments) Act 2009 , and
 the Fair Work Act 2009 confers small claims jurisdiction on the Court for various matters if the compensation is not more than $20 000.

The Court also has jurisdiction in relation to certain matters under the Independent Contractors Act 2006. This jurisdiction is exercised by the Court's Fair Work Division.

Intellectual property
 Copyright – The Court may hear civil claims and matters, under parts V, VAA, IX and Section 248J of the Copyright Act 1968 such as claims for injunctions and damages for breach of copyright.
 Trade Mark/Design – From 15 April 2013, the Federal Circuit Court will have certain jurisdiction under the Trade Marks Act 1995 and the Designs Act 2003. The jurisdiction is comparable to that exercised by the Federal Court except that it will not be able to hear an appeal from another court.

Migration
Reform in 2005 limited first instance jurisdiction to the Federal Circuit Court and the High Court to review administrative decisions made by the Minister for Immigration and Multicultural and Indigenous Affairs, the Refugee Review Tribunal and the Migration Review Tribunal. The Court does not have jurisdiction to undertake a merits review of these types of decisions.

Privacy
Enforcing determinations of the Privacy Commissioner and private sector adjudicators under the Privacy Act 1988.

Chief Judges 
The Court has a Chief Judge (previously known as the Chief Federal Magistrate when the Court was called the Federal Magistrates Court).

Only three people have served as Chief Judge or Chief Federal Magistrate. All three have subsequently (or concurrently) held the office of Chief Justice of the Family Court of Australia. They are:
 Diana Bryant (2000–04)
 John Pascoe (2004–17)
 Will Alstergren (2017–present) (who also holds the position of Chief Justice of the Family Court of Australia since 10 December 2018.)

List of Federal Circuit Court Judges
, the judges of the Court were:

Former judges include folk singer turned lawyer and judge, Judy Small, who served on the Court between 2014 and 2020, and Barbara Baker, now Governor of Tasmania, who served on the Court from 2008 to 2021.

Federal Circuit Court judges are assisted by Associates and Deputy Associates, many of whom are qualified lawyers.

The Court sits permanently in each state capital, although in Perth it only hears general federal law matters as the Family Court of Western Australia has sole jurisdiction over family law in that state.  The Court also sits permanently in the major regional centres of Launceston, Cairns, Townsville, Parramatta and Newcastle and regularly circuits to a large number of regional cities to hear family law cases. The Court hears some applications and evidence by telephone or video evidence when parties or witnesses live a long way from the Court.

In keeping with the Court's requirement to act as informally as possible, section 3 of the Federal Circuit Court Act, barristers are not required to robe for interim or interlocutory applications and wigs are not worn for any occasion. Barristers are only required to robe for final hearings before the Federal Circuit Court for all judgments, trials and contested hearings in which oral evidence is to be adduce practice direction number 1 of 2010

See also

Australian court hierarchy
List of Commonwealth courts and tribunals

References

External links
 Official website
 Federal Circuit Court of Australia Act 1999 (Cth) in ComLaw
 Federal Circuit Court Rules 2001 (Cth) in ComLaw
 Federal Court and Federal Circuit Court Regulation 2012 (Cth) in ComLaw
 Judgments of the Federal Circuit Court of Australia, 2013– in AustLII
 Judgments of the Federal Magistrates Court in general federal law, 2000–2013 in AustLII
 Judgments of the Federal Magistrates Court in family law, 2000–2013 in AustLII

1999 establishments in Australia
Commonwealth of Australia courts and tribunals
Courts and tribunals established in 1999
 
 Former Commonwealth of Australia courts and tribunals